Huang An may refer to:

Huang'an, former name of Hong'an County, Hubei, China
Ah Louis (1840–1936), or Huang An, Chinese-American banker
Huang Yi (author) (1952–2017), or Huang An, Hong Kong writer
Huang An (singer) (born 1962), Taiwanese singer
Huang An (character), in the novel Water Margin